The Sri Damansara Timur MRT station (Working name: Kepong Sentral) is a mass rapid transit (MRT) station in the township of Bandar Sri Damansara in Damansara, Selangor, Malaysia. It is one of the stations on the MRT Putrajaya line.

The station began operations on 16 June 2022, as part of Phase One operations of the Putrajaya Line.

Location 
The station is located next to the Kuala Lumpur Middle Ring Road 2 , next to the Selangor-Federal Territory border.

The station is also a tripoint of three local authorities: the Petaling Jaya City Council, Selayang Municipal Council and Kuala Lumpur City Hall.

Station features 

 Elevated station with island platform
 Park & Ride

Interchange with KTM Komuter station 
The station is an interchange with the Malayan Railways network via the Kepong Sentral Komuter station , which serves the Port Klang Line and KTM ETS.

References

External links 
 Sri Damansara West MRT Station | mrt.com.my
 Klang Valley Mass Rapid Transit website
 MRT Hawk-Eye View

Rapid transit stations in Kuala Lumpur
Sungai Buloh-Serdang-Putrajaya Line
Rapid transit stations in Selangor
Railway stations opened in 2022